A Testimonial Dinner: The Songs of XTC is a 1995 tribute album, featuring a variety of artists covering songs from the British band XTC. Unusually, XTC make an appearance on their own tribute album under the pseudonym Terry and the Lovemen – their contribution, "The Good Things", is an outtake from their 1989 album Oranges & Lemons. The album also includes They Might Be Giants performing "25 O'Clock", a song by the XTC side-project the Dukes of Stratosphear.

Track listing

References

XTC tribute albums
1995 compilation albums
Pop rock compilation albums